The 15th Gold Cup was a motor race, run to Formula One rules, held on 17 August 1968 at Oulton Park, England. The race was run over 40 laps of the circuit, and was won by British driver Jackie Stewart in a Matra MS10.

Results

References
 Results at Silhouet.com 
 Results at F1 Images.de 

International Gold Cup
International Gold Cup
Gold
August 1968 sports events in the United Kingdom